Weatherhead is a surname. Notable people with the surname include:

A.E. Weatherhead, British colonial administrator
 Betsy Weatherhead, American atmospheric scientist
Christopher Weatherhead, Northampton University student who served a prison sentence for hacking
David Weatherhead (1928–2012), Canadian politician
Ian Weatherhead (born 1932), English watercolour artist
James Weatherhead (1931–2017), minister of the Church of Scotland
John Weatherhead (Royal Navy officer) (1775–1797)
Leslie Weatherhead (1893–1976), English theologian
Shaun Weatherhead (born 1970), English footballer